HD 111597 is a suspected astrometric binary star system in the southern constellation of Centaurus. It has the Bayer designation p Centauri, while HD 111597 is the star's identifier from the Henry Draper catalogue. The system is visible to the naked eye as a faint point of light with an apparent visual magnitude of 4.90. It is located at a distance of approximately 380 light years from the Sun based on parallax, and has an absolute magnitude of −0.53. The system is a probable member of the Sco OB2 association of co-moving stars. The visible component is a B-type main-sequence star with a stellar classification of B9V.

References 

B-type main-sequence stars
Centaurus (constellation)
Centauri, p
Durchmusterung objects
111597
062683
4874
Binary stars